Kari Tapani Rahkamo (born 30 May 1933) is a Finnish athlete, politician, and Mayor of Helsinki in 1991–1996. He competed in the men's triple jump at the 1956 Summer Olympics and the 1960 Summer Olympics.

References

1933 births
Living people
Athletes (track and field) at the 1956 Summer Olympics
Athletes (track and field) at the 1960 Summer Olympics
Finnish male triple jumpers
Mayors of Helsinki
Olympic athletes of Finland
Place of birth missing (living people)